This is a list of Estonian television related events from 1983.

Events

Debuts
 30 October – television series "Prillitoos" started. The series was led by Hagi Šein.

Television shows

Ending this year

Births

Deaths

See also
 1983 in Estonia

References

1980s in Estonian television